John McCormack may refer to:

Sportspeople
Cec McCormack or John Cecil McCormack (1922–1995), English footballer
John McCormack (ice hockey) (1925–2017), Canadian ice hockey player
John McCormack (boxer) (1935–2014), Scottish boxer
John McCormack (diver) (1925-1987), American Olympic diver
Young McCormack or John McCormack (born 1944), Irish boxer
John McCormack (footballer, born 1955), Scottish football player and manager
John McCormack (footballer, born 1965), Scottish football player
John McCormack (Irish footballer) (fl. 1970s–1980s)
John McCormack (racing driver) (fl. 1970s), Australian
John McCormack (baseball) (fl. 1980s-2010s), American college baseball coach

Others
John MacCormac (1791–1865), Irish timber merchant
John McCormack (tenor) (1884–1945), Irish tenor
John W. McCormack (1891–1980), politician from Massachusetts, Speaker of the House of Representatives, 1962–1971
John Edward McCormack (1917–1953), lawyer and political figure in Saskatchewan
John McCormack (bishop) (1921–1996), Catholic bishop of the Diocese of Meath, Ireland
John Brendan McCormack (1935–2021), Catholic bishop of the Diocese of Manchester, New Hampshire
John McCormack (Ohio politician) (born 1940s), former member of the Ohio House of Representatives
John McCormack (journalist) (born 1980s?), American political journalist

See also
Jack McCormack (disambiguation)
John McCormick (disambiguation)